Alexander Yanyushkin (born 30 October 1982 in Penza) is a Russian rugby union coach and former player, he is the head coach of the Lokomotiv Penza and Russia 7s.

He played for VVA-Podmoskovye Monino, in the Russian Professional League, since 2009/10.

Yanyshkin had 70 for Russia, from 2002 to 2015, scoring 10 tries, 9 conversions and 16 penalties scored, 116 points in aggregate. He was called for the 2011 Rugby World Cup, playing in three games and scoring a try.

References

External links

1982 births
Living people
Russian rugby union players
Russia international rugby union players
Rugby union fly-halves
Rugby union scrum-halves